Chatom Union School District is a school district based in Stanislaus County, California, United States.  The district operates Chatom Pre-School, Chatom Elementary School (grades K–5), and Mountain View Middle School (grades 6–8).

References

External links

School districts in Stanislaus County, California